This is a list of number-one hit singles in 1963 in New Zealand from the Lever Hit Parade.

Chart

References

 Number One Singles Of 1963

1963 in New Zealand
1963 record charts
1963
1960s in New Zealand music